The 33rd International 500-Mile Sweepstakes was an automobile race held at the Indianapolis Motor Speedway on Monday, May 30, 1949.

After two years of failures to his teammate, Bill Holland finally won one for himself, giving car owner Lou Moore his third consecutive Indy victory. Mauri Rose was fired by the team after the race when he again ignored orders and tried to pass Holland, only to see his car fail with 8 laps to go.

Spider Webb suffered a broken transmission the morning of the race and failed to start. Rather than utilize an alternate starter, officials awarded Webb 33rd finishing position.

Results

Alternates
First alternate: Ralph Pratt  (#34)

Failed to Qualify

Les Anderson (#74)
Henry Banks (#35)
Frank Beardsley 
Randall Beinke  (#42)
Tony Bettenhausen (#16, #46)
Lindley Bothwell  (#66)
Frank Brisko (#48)
Walt Brown (#18)
Jim Brubaker  (#79)
Frank Burany  (#24)
Jimmy Daywalt  (#56)
Billy Devore
Ted Duncan  (#72)
Kenny Eaton  (#55)
Milt Fankhouser (#73)
Pat Flaherty  (#43)
Dick Fraizer  (#59)
Eddie Haddad  (#47)
Mel Hansen (#44)
Tommy Hinnershitz (#15, #18)
Byron Horne  (#39)
Danny Kladis (#58)
Tommy Mattson 
Johnny Mauro (#16)
George Metzler  (#67) - Fatal accident
Chet Miller (#65)
Hal Robson (#23)
Mike Salay (#49)
Wally Stokes  (#75)
Bill Taylor  (#51)
Joel Thorne (#81)
Louis Tomei (#42)
Doc Williams (#65)

Broadcasting

Radio
The race was carried live on the Mutual Broadcasting System, the precursor to the IMS Radio Network. The broadcast was sponsored by Perfect Circle Piston Rings and Bill Slater served as the anchor. The broadcast featured live coverage of the start, the finish, and live updates throughout the race.

Television
The race was carried live for the first time in history on local television on WFBM-TV channel 6 of Indianapolis. The station signed on for the first time race morning May 30, 1949, with a documentary about the race entitled The Crucible of Speed, then covered the race itself. The race broadcast utilized three cameras located along the main stretch. Earl Townsend, Jr. who had worked previously as a radio reporter, was the first television announcer. Dick Pittenger and Paul Roberts joined Townsend along with engineer Robert Robbins. The telecast reached approximately 3,000 local households.

See also

 1949 AAA Championship Car season

Notes

Works cited
1949 Indianapolis 500 Radio Broadcast, Mutual: Re-broadcast on "The All-Night Race Party" – WIBC-AM (May 28, 2005)
Van Camp's Pork & Beans Presents: Great Moments From the Indy 500 – Fleetwood Sounds, 1975

References

Indianapolis 500 races
Indianapolis 500
Indianapolis 500